Wyoming Highway 340 (WYO 340) is a  east-west State Road in the U.S. state of Wyoming that runs through the community of Story in southern Sheridan County.

Route description
Wyoming Highway 340 travels from Sheridan County Route 2 just west of Story east into the community as North Piney Creek Road. It changes into Crooked Street as it turns southeast in Story and reaches its eastern end at Wyoming Highway 194.

Major intersections

References

External links 

Wyoming State Routes 300-399
WYO 340 - WYO 194 to Sheridan CR 2
Story, WY website

Transportation in Sheridan County, Wyoming
340